Edward Hastings (1849 – 31 May 1905) was an Australian cricketer. He played two first-class cricket matches for Victoria between 1875 and 1878.

See also
 List of Victoria first-class cricketers

References

External links
 

1849 births
1905 deaths
Australian cricketers
Victoria cricketers
Place of birth missing
English emigrants to colonial Australia